If I Were Your Woman is the eleventh studio album by American recording artist Stephanie Mills, released on June 1, 1987 on MCA Records. 
The album peaked at No. 1 on the Billboard Top R&B/Hip-Hop Albums chart and No. 30 on the Billboard 200 chart. If I Were Your Woman was also certified Gold and Platinum in the US by the RIAA.

Singles
A song from the LP called I Feel Good All Over reached No. 1 on the Billboard Hot Soul Songs chart and No. 22 on the Billboard Dance Single Sales chart. Another single called (You're Puttin') A Rush on Me peaked at No. 1 on the Billboard Hot Soul Songs chart and No. 15 on the Billboard Dance Single Sales chart.
A remix of (You're Puttin') A Rush on Me peaked at No. 23 on the Billboard Dance Club Songs chart. The album's title track also reached No. 19 on the Billboard Hot Soul Songs chart.

Track listing

Personnel 
 Stephanie Mills – lead vocals, backing vocals (2, 3, 6, 7)
 Donald Robinson – acoustic piano (1), Rhodes piano (1)
 Randy Cantor – synthesizers (1)
 Ron Kersey – keyboards (2), programming (2)
 Paul Laurence – all other instruments (3)
 Robert Brookins – keyboards (4), programming (4)
 George Duke – acoustic piano (4)
 Barry Eastmond – keyboards (5), pianos (6)
 LaForrest "La La" Cope – keyboards (5), arrangements (5)
 V. Jeffrey Smith – synthesizers (5), additional programming (5), rhythm arrangements (5)
 Skip Anderson – acoustic piano (7)
 Keith Andes – additional synthesizers (7)
 Davy D – all instruments (8)
 Randy Bowland – guitars (1)
 Herb Smith – guitars (2)
 Kevin Chokan – guitars (4)
 Ira Siegel – guitars (5, 6)
 Mike Campbell – guitars (7)
 Doug Grigsby – bass (1)
 Freddie Washington – bass (2)
 Timmy Allen – bass (3)
 Wayne Braithwaite – bass (5, 6, 7), synthesizers (7), drum programming (7)
 Darryl Burgee – drums (1), percussion (1)
 John Paris – drum overdubs (4)
 Yogi Horton – drums (5)
 Terry Silverlight – drums (6)
 Jimmy Maelen – percussion (5)
 Bashiri Johnson – percussion (6)
 Nick Martinelli – arrangements (1)
 Edith Wint – string contractor (6)
 Richard Henrickson – concertmaster (6)
 Cynthia Biggs – backing vocals (1)
 Deborah Dukes – backing vocals (1)
 Annette Hardeman – backing vocals (1)
 Gabriel Hardeman – backing vocals (1), arrangements (1)
 Charlene Holloway – backing vocals (1)
 Gordon Scott – backing vocals (1)
 Alex Brown – backing vocals (2, 4, 6, 7, 8), BGV arrangements (2, 4-7)
 Lynn Davis – backing vocals (2)
 Vesta Williams – backing vocals (2)
 Marva King – backing vocals (4)
 Paulette McWilliams – backing vocals (4)
 Julia Tillman Waters – backing vocals (6, 7, 8)
 Maxine Waters – backing vocals (6, 7, 8)
 Cliff Branch – backing vocals (7)

Technical
 Taavi Mote – remix engineer 
 Hill Swimmer – engineer (1)
 Erik Zobler – engineer (2)
 Ron Banks – engineer (3)
 Louil Silas Jr. – remixing (3, 5)
 Mitch Gibson – engineer (4)
 Tommy Vicari – engineer (4, 8)
 Philip Walters – engineer (4)
 Carl Beatty – engineer (5)
 Fernando Kral – engineer (5, 6)
 Cassandra Mills – remixing (5)
 John Convertino – engineer (6, 7)
 Acar Key – engineer (6, 7)
 Brian Max – engineer (6, 7)
 Barbara Milne – engineer (6, 7)
 Bryan "Chuck" New – engineer (6, 7)
 Jon Smith – engineer (6, 7)

Design
 Cassandra Mills – executive producer, album concept 
 Stephanie Mills – executive producer, album concept
 September – art direction, design 
 Ron Slenzak – photography 
 Jeffrey Beaton – make-up
 James Gibson – hair stylist 
 Starlight Music, Inc. – management

Charts

Singles

See also
List of number-one R&B albums of 1987 (U.S.)

References

1987 albums
Stephanie Mills albums
MCA Records albums